Jalan Kampung Maju Jaya (Johor state road J192), known as Jalan Seelong, is a major road in Johor, Malaysia.

List of junctions

Roads in Johor